Dominican Republic is scheduled to compete at the 2023 Pan American Games in Santiago, Chile from October 20 to November 5, 2023. This was Dominican Republic's 18th appearance at the Pan American Games, having competed at every edition of the Games except 1963.

Competitors
The following is the list of number of competitors (per gender) participating at the games per sport/discipline.

Canoeing

Sprint
Dominican Republic qualified a total of one sprint athlete (one man).

Men

Cycling

Dominican Republic qualified 1 cyclist at the Caribbean Championships.

Road
Men

Football

Dominican Republic qualified a men's team of 18 athletes after finishing as the top ranked Caribbean team at the 2022 CONCACAF U-20 Championship.

Men's tournament

Summary

Judo

Dominican Republic has qualified one female judoka after winning the category at the 2021 Junior Pan American Games.

Women

Modern pentathlon

Dominican Republic qualified four modern pentathletes (two men and two women).

Roller sports

Figure
Dominican Republic qualified a male athlete in figure skating.

Sailing

Dominican Republic has qualified 1 boat for a total of 1 sailor.

Men

Shooting

Dominican Republic qualified a total of four shooters in the 2022 Americas Shooting Championships.

Men
Shotgun

Volleyball

Indoor

Men's tournament

Dominican Republic qualified a men's team (of 12 athletes) after being the best team from NORCECA at the 2021 Junior Pan American Games.

Summary

Women's tournament

Dominican Republic qualified a women's team (of 12 athletes) by winning the 2021 Women's Pan-American Volleyball Cup.

Summary

Water skiing

Dominican Republic qualified four water skiers during the 2022 Pan American Water skiing Championship.

Men

Women

Wrestling

Dominican Republic qualified eight wrestlers (seven men and one woman) through the 2022 Pan American Wrestling Championships held in Acapulco, Mexico.

Men

Women

See also
Dominican Republic at the 2024 Summer Olympics

References

Nations at the 2023 Pan American Games
2023
2023 in Dominican Republic sport